Jason Williams (born November 17, 1983) is an American professional basketball player. A 1.98 m (6'6") forward, Williams last played for Chorale Roanne Basket of the LNB Pro B and has been a free agent since 2019. He formerly appeared at the Euroleague with the European powerhouse Maccabi Tel Aviv.

College career
Williams played college basketball at the University of Texas at El Paso (UTEP). He helped the Miners to three straight postseason appearances and 72 wins during his three-year career at UTEP. He finished his career with 1,225 points, 614 rebounds and 300 assists. He was named to the Second Team All-Conference USA, the 2005 All-WAC Defense Team and the 2004 WAC All-Tournament Team.

On March 14, 2006, in the second-to-last game of his college career, Williams recorded the first triple-double in UTEP school history (also his first). He had 17 points, 11 rebounds and 10 assists in an NIT Tournament victory over Lipscomb.

Professional career
He joined the Israeli League club Bnei HaSharon in 2006. In 2008, he joined the Israeli club Maccabi Tel Aviv. In 2009, he joined Ironi Nahariya.

On June 13, 2017, Williams joined the French club Roanne from LNB Pro B.

Suspension
On December 7, 2005, Williams was suspended indefinitely by UTEP for breaking the jaw of freshman teammate Stefon Jackson with a sucker punch during a particularly physical practice. Since Williams was the team's best player, his suspension ended up being only one game when Jackson, his victim, urged coach Doc Sadler to reinstate Williams for the good of the team.

References

External links
LNB Pro B profile
Euroleague.net Player Profile

1983 births
Living people
African-American basketball players
American expatriate basketball people in Argentina
American expatriate basketball people in Canada
American expatriate basketball people in France
American expatriate basketball people in Israel
American expatriate basketball people in Italy
American men's basketball players
Bnei HaSharon players
Chorale Roanne Basket players
Estudiantes de Bahía Blanca basketball players
Halifax Rainmen players
Hapoel Be'er Sheva B.C. players
Ironi Nahariya players
JA Vichy players
JA Vichy-Clermont Métropole players
Junior college men's basketball players in the United States
Kilgore College alumni
Maccabi Tel Aviv B.C. players
Pallalcesto Amatori Udine players
Small forwards
UTEP Miners men's basketball players
21st-century African-American sportspeople
20th-century African-American people